The 2012 All-Ireland Senior Camogie Championship—known as the All-Ireland Senior Camogie Championship in association with RTÉ Sport for sponsorship reasons— is the premier competition of the 2012 camogie season. It commenced on 23 June 2012 and ended with the final on 16 September. Eight county teams compete in the Senior Championship out of twenty-seven who compete overall in the Senior, Intermediate and Junior Championships. Wexford defeated Cork in the final. The championship was notable for the qualification of Offaly for the All-Ireland semi-final just three years after they had been graded junior. Quarter-final stages of the championships were re-introduced for the first time since 2006. The 2012 championship was the first to be held under new rules which allowed two points for a point direct from a sideline ball.

Provincial championships
There was an indication of changes in the camogie hierarchy in the provincial championships which were held before the All-Ireland senior championship began. Clare won the Munster championship for the first time since 1944, beating Cork in the final. Offaly defeated Kilkenny in the Leinster semi-final and although Wexford beat Offaly by 1-12 to 1-7 to win the Leinster final, they were boosted by the experience. Offaly went on to beat Kilkenny for the second time in a championship play-off and then Dublin in the All-Ireland quarter final to qualify for the All-Ireland semi-final for the first time. Clare qualified for the All-Ireland quarter final only to lose to their Munster final victims Cork.

Structure 
The eight teams were divided into two groups - Cork, Dublin, Galway and Tipperary in Group 1, and Clare, Kilkenny, Offaly and Wexford in Group 2. 
Teams received 2 points for a win, 1 point for a draw. The top four teams then contested the semi-finals. All teams in Group 1 played all teams in Group 2. The top team from each group went into the semi-final on opposite sides of the draw. The second team from each group went into quarter-finals on opposite sides of the draw. The third in Group 1 played fourth in Group 2 for a place in the quarter-final and the fourth in Group 1 played the third in Group 2 for a place in the quarter-final. 
There were draws to decide who played who in the quarter-finals and for home venue for the quarter-finals.

Management changes
For the first time in the history of the championship no female manager had charge if a county team. Wexford retained JJ Doyle as manager. Paudie Murray, brother of goalkeeper Aoife, took over as manager of Cork. Tony Ward took over from Noel Finn as Galway manager. Brendan Williams became Kilkenny manager as Ann Downey departed after four seasons in charge. John Lillis became manager of Tipperary, John Carmody took over from Patsy Fahy as manager of Clare, and John Troy was new manager of Offaly after Joachim Kelly’s achievement in bringing them from junior to senior status in three seasons.

Dual players
Cork players Briege Corkery and Rena Buckley also played for the Cork senior ladies' football team that won the 2012 All-Ireland Senior Ladies' Football Championship. Two Women's Irish Hockey League players played in the championship, Naomi Carroll of Clare and of Emer Lucey of Dublin.

Opening Rounds
The new structure threw up several surprises not least being Offaly’s progression to the semi-final despite finishing joint bottom of the group stages. For the third year in succession Galway defeated the eventual champions in the group stages, but having lost the previous two All- Ireland finals to the same opposition, they failed to reach the final thanks to a late surge by Cork in the semi-final. Offaly achieved a major breakthrough by qualifying for the semi-final.

Controversy
An offer by Wexford GAA to Wexford camogie to staging a double-header between the hurling, and Wexford versus Cork in camogie was rejected by Wexford camogie board

Semi-final
Galway, losing finalists in 2010 and 2011 were defeated in the All-Ireland semifinal by Cork with late double Late goals from Katriona Mackey and Síle Burns.

Results

Group stage

Table

Play-offs

Final stages 

MATCH RULES
60 minutes
Replay if scores level
Maximum of 5 substitutions

References

External links
 Fixtures 2012.xls 2012 Fixture list download 

2012
2012
All-Ireland Senior Camogie Championship